Bradford Ryan Lundblade (born September 21, 1995) is an American football center who is a free agent. He played college football at Oklahoma State.

Professional career

Seattle Seahawks
Lundblade was signed by the Seattle Seahawks as an undrafted free agent on May 4, 2018, but was waived three days later.

Cincinnati Bengals
On May 14, 2018, Lundblade was signed by the Cincinnati Bengals. He was waived on September 1, 2018 and was signed to the practice squad the next day. He signed a reserve/future contract on December 31, 2018. He was waived on August 31, 2019.

Carolina Panthers
On September 3, 2019, Lundblade was signed to the Carolina Panthers practice squad. He was promoted to the active roster on November 29, 2019. He was waived on December 5, 2019.

New York Jets
On December 9, 2019, Lundblade was signed to the New York Jets practice squad. He signed a reserve/future contract with the Jets on December 30, 2019. He was waived on September 5, 2020.

Seattle Seahawks (second stint)
On November 23, 2020, Lundblade was signed to the Seattle Seahawks practice squad. On January 11, 2021, Lundblade signed a reserve/futures contract with the Seahawks.

On August 31, 2021, Lundblade was waived by the Seahawks. He was re-signed to the practice squad on October 27. He was released on November 4.

References

External links
Oklahoma State Cowboys bio

1995 births
Living people
American football centers
Carolina Panthers players
Cincinnati Bengals players
Oklahoma State Cowboys football players
New York Jets players
People from Denton County, Texas
Players of American football from Texas
Seattle Seahawks players
Sportspeople from the Dallas–Fort Worth metroplex